Mirza Cihan (born 26 October 2000) is a Turkish professional footballer who plays as a winger for Gaziantep.

Professional career
A youth product of Gaziantep, Cihan was promoted to the first team in 2017 and debuted in the TFF First League in 2017. He transferred to Galatasaray where he stayed from 2018 to 2020, before returning to Gaziantep on 20 September 2020. Cihan made his professional debut with Gaziantep in a 2–0 Süper Lig win over Başakşehir on 8 April 2021.

References

External links
 
 

2000 births
Living people
Sportspeople from Denizli
Turkish footballers
Gaziantep F.K. footballers
Galatasaray S.K. footballers
Süper Lig players
TFF First League players
Association football wingers